The Fayetteville SwampDogs were a collegiate summer baseball team that played in the Coastal Plain League. The team plays its home games at J. P. Riddle Stadium, nicknamed "The Swamp", in Fayetteville, North Carolina. The SwampDogs have played in the Coastal Plain League since the 2001 season, when they finished atop the South division with a record of 18 wins and 8 losses.  The SwampDogs replaced the Cape Fear Crocs at J. P. Riddle Stadium.

The team announced on October 3, 2019 that they would sit out the 2020 Coastal Plain League season and relocate afterwards, having failed to reach a new lease agreement on J. P. Riddle Stadium.

Alumni
 David Aardsma (2001); pitcher, Chicago White Sox
 Mark Reynolds (2003); third Baseman, Washington Nationals
 Andy Dirks (2005); outfielder, Detroit Tigers 
 Michael McKenry (2005); catcher, Pittsburgh Pirates
 Blake Gailen (2005–06); outfielder, Los Angeles Dodgers organization
 Carter Capps (2010); pitcher, Seattle Mariners
 Kevin Quackenbush (2008); pitcher, San Diego Padres
 Layne Somsen (2012); pitcher, Cincinnati Reds

External links
 Coastal Plain League

References

Coastal Plain League
Sports in Fayetteville, North Carolina
Baseball teams established in 2001
2001 establishments in North Carolina